Flights in Dreams and Reality is a 1983 Soviet drama film directed by Roman Balayan, written by Viktor Merezhko, dealing with the subject matter of midlife crisis. 

The film features many highly acclaimed Soviet/Russian actors, with Oleg Yankovsky in the starring role, as well as Lyudmila Gurchenko, Oleg Tabakov, Aleksandr Adabashyan and Oleg Menshikov in supporting roles.

Plot
On the eve of his fortieth birthday, Sergey Makarov (Oleg Yankovsky) is summing up his life. But nothing brings satisfaction to him, neither wife, mistress, work, or friends.

At forty a person achieves many things, but previous ideals often lose their value. Sergey becomes completely confused, he is not bound to his wife with anything other than obligations, and he develops affection for a young girl named Alisa (Elena Kostina). Sergey is loved by a beautiful woman Larisa (Lyudmila Gurchenko), working with him at the drawing board, but he ignores her crush towards him. However, he uses her car, knowing that she is always willing to bail him out. Sergei's supervisor, Nikolai Pavlovich (Oleg Tabakov) loves her but without reciprocation. Alice has one boyfriend, a young guy (Oleg Menshikov), slickly wooing her. He easily wins against Sergei in arm wrestling, to which Sergei responds with shouting "cock-a-doodle-doo" under the table at his birthday party, to which all colleagues and his young sweetheart are invited.

The main character of the film begins to experience a middle-age crisis; it seems that a big part of everything he wanted, is in fact, nothing more than empty vanity. Constant feeling of discomfort and dissatisfaction makes the hero rush between the people and do strange things in the hope that there will be a change in his life, that something will happen what was previously unavailable.

"Oh, Sergei, Sergei, how jealous I was of you in college, ... but now, I regret it, everything about your life is topsy-turvy, – says Sergei's boss, Nicholai Pavlovich in a conversation in the kitchen, thus explaining Sergei's strange behavior which is evident to everyone. – Well, you are sick Sergei, do you not comprehend this?"

Cast
 Oleg Yankovsky as Sergei Makarov
 Lyudmila Gurchenko as Larisa Kuzmina, Makarov's colleague and former lover
 Oleg Tabakov as Nikolai Pavlovich, Makarov's boss
 Lyudmila Ivanova as Nina, Makarov's colleague
 Lyudmila Zorina as Natasha, Makarov's wife
 Elena Kostina as Alice Suvorov, Makarov's mistress (voiced by Yelena Koreneva)
 Oleg Menshikov as Sergei Sinitsyn, Alice's friend
 Lybov Rudneva as Svetlana, Makarov's colleague
 Aleksandr Adabashyan as sculptor (voiced by Yuri Bogatyryov)
 Nikita Mikhalkov as director
 Elena Mikhailova as railway points operator (E. Cherniak, uncredited)
 Alena Odinokova as Masha, Makarov's daughter
 Valery Panarin as Makarov's friend

Production
Famous actor/director Nikita Mikhalkov makes a cameo appearance in the film, playing a film director. The role of Sergei Makarov was originally designed with him in mind. But when working on the script, director Roman Balayan saw the TV film "We, the Undersigned" starring Oleg Yankovsky and decided that he should play the main character.

Release and awards 
The film was not made available until early 1983, initially being granted a very limited release, and was not widely seen until the time of Perestroika. With the film being exposed to larger audiences, it went on to gain critical acclaim. 

Yankovsky received the 1987 USSR State Prize for his role.

At the time of its release, politically minded viewers perceived it as a critique of Brezhnevian “stagnation”.

References

External links 

1983 drama films
Soviet drama films
Russian drama films
1983 films
Films directed by Roman Balayan